Mozaffarabad (also Romanized as Moz̧affarābād) is a village in Somghan Rural District, Chenar Shahijan District, Kazerun County, Fars Province, Iran. At the 2006 census, its population was 309, in 74 families.

References 

Populated places in Chenar Shahijan County